David Eusthatios Manolopoulos (born 14 December 1961) is a Professor of Theoretical Chemistry at University of Oxford. His research focuses on the computational modeling of the dynamics of elementary chemical reactions in the gas phase and quantum mechanical effects in chemical dynamics. His research highlights include work on path integral approach to molecular dynamics and chemical topics as diverse as fullerenes, ring polymers, reactive scattering, and more recently, the molecular and quantum mechanism of avian magnetoreception.

He was awarded the Marlow Award and the Corday–Morgan Prize. He has been involved with editing the Journal of Chemical Physics.

Bibliography

See also 
 Quantum biology

External links 
 Personal site at University of Oxford

References 

Living people
Physical chemists
Fellows of the Royal Society
Academics of the University of Oxford
Alumni of the University of Cambridge
Academics of the University of Nottingham
1961 births
People from Gillingham, Kent
Chemical physicists